The Duchess of Langeais (French: La Duchesse de Langeais) is a 1942 French historical drama film directed by Jacques de Baroncelli and starring Edwige Feuillère, Pierre Richard-Willm and Aimé Clariond. It is also known as Wicked Duchess.

It is based on the 1834 novel of the same name by Honoré de Balzac. It was shot at the Buttes-Chaumont Studios in Paris. The film's sets were designed by the art director Serge Piménoff.

Cast
 Edwige Feuillère as Antoinette de Langeais  
 Pierre Richard-Willm as Armand de Montriveau  
 Aimé Clariond as Ronquerolles  
 Lise Delamare as Madame de Serizy  
 Charles Granval as Le vidame de Pamiers  
 Irène Bonheur as Caroline  
 Marthe Mellot as La mère supérieure  
 Simone Renant as La vicomtesse de Fontaines  
 Hélène Constant as Paméla  
 Madeleine Pagès as Suzette  
 Dorothée Luss as Madame de Lestorade  
 Jacques Varennes as Le duc de Langeais 
 Catherine Fonteney as La princesse de Blamont-Chauvry  
 Georges Mauloy as Le duc de Grandieu  
 Philippe Richard as Le portier  
 Gaston Mauger as Louis XVIII
 Maurice Dorléac as Le baron de Maulincour  
 Henri Richard as Le duc de Navareins  
 Georges Grey as Marsay

References

Bibliography 
 Rège, Philippe. Encyclopedia of French Film Directors, Volume 1. Scarecrow Press, 2009.

External links 
 

1942 films
1940s French-language films
Films directed by Jacques de Baroncelli
French historical drama films
1940s historical drama films
Films based on works by Honoré de Balzac
Films based on French novels
Films set in the 1820s
French black-and-white films
1942 drama films
1940s French films